Don Lorenzo is a 1952 Italian musical melodrama film directed by Carlo Ludovico Bragaglia and starring Luciano Tajoli, Rossana Podestà and Andrea Checchi.  It was shot at the Cinecittà Studios in Rome. The film's sets were designed by the art director Alberto Boccianti.

Cast

References

Bibliography
 Accardo, Alessio. Age & Scarpelli: la storia si fa commedia. A.N.C.C.I., 2001.

External links
 

1952 films
1950s Italian-language films
1950s musical drama films
Films directed by Carlo Ludovico Bragaglia
Italian musical drama films
1952 drama films
Italian black-and-white films
1950s Italian films
Films shot at Cinecittà Studios